Robert Walker (born 16 June 1982, in Glasgow) is a Scottish footballer who played as a defender, for junior side Arthurlie.

Career
Walker started his senior career with South Lanarkshire club Hamilton Academical after signing from Glasgow junior side Maryhill, before playing one season for both Dumbarton and Stranraer.

After leaving the Stair Park side, Walker played at Cliftonhill with Albion Rovers for two seasons before going amateur with Queen's Park in 2009.

Walker was released by Queen's Park at the end of the 2009-10 season.

After his release, Walker signed for Barrhead side Arthurlie.

References

Sources

1982 births
Scottish footballers
Association football defenders
Hamilton Academical F.C. players
Dumbarton F.C. players
Stranraer F.C. players
Albion Rovers F.C. players
Queen's Park F.C. players
Living people
Scottish Football League players
Scottish Junior Football Association players
Footballers from Glasgow
Maryhill F.C. players
Arthurlie F.C. players